The C class is a series of 8 container ships built for Maersk Line. The ships were built by Odense Steel Shipyard in Denmark and have a maximum theoretical capacity of around 9,640 twenty-foot equivalent units (TEU). 

The last three ships were built with a slightly different design compared to the first five. Overall they are slightly wider and were built with a slightly taller bridge. 

Between 2011 and 2016, five of the ships were upgraded at the Qingdao Beihai Shipbuilding Heavy Industry shipyard in China.

List of ships

See also 

 Maersk Triple E-class container ship
 Maersk E-class container ship
 Maersk H-class container ship
 Maersk Edinburgh-class container ship
 Gudrun Maersk-class container ship
 Maersk M-class container ship

References 

Container ship classes
Ships of the Maersk Line